Tree poppy is a name used for various plants in the family Papaveraceae:

 Genus Dendromecon
 Genus Romneya
 Bocconia frutescens